Flight 904 may refer to

Whyalla Airlines Flight 904, crashed on 31 May 2000
Kam Air Flight 904, crashed on 3 February 2005
Lion Air Flight 904, crashed on 13 April 2013

0904